Namo (or Kaunje, Mari, Na, or Dorro) is a Yam language spoken in Western Province, Papua New Guinea.

References

Nambu languages
Languages of Western Province (Papua New Guinea)